Thomas is an unincorporated community in Bureau County, Illinois, United States, located west of New Bedford.

References

Unincorporated communities in Bureau County, Illinois
Unincorporated communities in Illinois